Adamówek  is a village in the administrative district of Gmina Czosnów, within Nowy Dwór County, Masovian Voivodeship, in east-central Poland.

References

External links
 Jewish Community in Adamówek on Virtual Shtetl

Villages in Nowy Dwór Mazowiecki County